Iliyan Simeonov (born 12 January 1974) is a retired Bulgarian footballer who played as a forward.

References

External links
Player Profile at levskisofia.info

1974 births
Living people
Bulgarian footballers
PFC Levski Sofia players
SG Wattenscheid 09 players
FC Lokomotiv 1929 Sofia players
Botev Plovdiv players
First Professional Football League (Bulgaria) players
2. Bundesliga players
Association football forwards
Bulgarian expatriate footballers
Expatriate footballers in Germany
Bulgarian expatriate sportspeople in Germany